This is a list of traditional sets of playing cards or gaming tiles such as mahjong tiles or dominoes. A typical traditional pack of playing cards consists of up to 52 regular cards, organized into four suits, and optionally some additional cards meant for playing, such as jokers or tarot trumps. The cards of each suit typically form a hierarchy of ranks. However, some traditional packs, especially from Asia, follow a different scheme.

French suited
French-suited cards are the most popular design and can be found in most countries. Historically, kings were the highest cards and aces were the lowest, and this hierarchy is sometimes still prescribed for cutting. Aces are now the most common high card in most games. In Ace–Ten card games such as Pinochle, tens have the second-highest card-point value and therefore tend to rank high between ace and king rather than in their natural position. Other common high cards are twos, threes, and jacks.

Full French-suited
The full French-suited pack contains 52 cards, organized into the 4 French card suits spades, clubs, diamonds and hearts and 13 ranks. The modern common hierarchy is ace > king > queen > jack > 10 > 9 > 8 > 7 > 6 > 5 > 4 > 3 > 2, i.e. aces are high and twos are low. Many decks in France and Belgium use the numeral "1" for the ace. Full French-suited packs often contain anywhere from one to four jokers with two being the most common, which are needed for some games. Zwicker decks come with six jokers. Jokers have neither suit nor rank. Some packs are sold with accessories needed for specific games like cribbage boards, bidding boxes, or cut cards.

Double packs (2x52 plus jokers) and triple packs (3x52 plus jokers) with the same back designs are sold for Canasta and Samba. These decks may contain point values marked on the cards.

Stripped French-suited

24-card stripped decks are often sold in Germany and Austria for Schnapsen. These decks go from nines to aces in each suit. Doubled versions of this deck (2x24) are used to play Pinochle and Doppelkopf.

32-card packs have ranks seven through ace in each suit and are very common in Europe. They are used to play Piquet, Belote, Skat, Klaverjas, and Préférence. Doubled decks (2x32) are sold for Bezique. They are sometimes known as Piquet packs.

36-card packs go from ranks six through ace in each suit. This pack is in use in western Switzerland as the French-suited Jass pack and is quite common in Russia for playing Durak. It was once used to play Piquet until the sixes were dropped.

40-card packs are found mostly in Latin countries where they compete against local Italian or Spanish suited decks. These sets range from two to seven and jack to ace in each suit. An exception is Portugal where the ranks go from two to six, eight, and jack to ace.

Expanded French-suited
63-card packs are produced for playing the six-handed version of 500, a variant of Euchre. These decks add elevens, twelves, red thirteens, and a single joker to the standard 52 card pack. The decks are mostly sold in the United States, Canada, Australia, New Zealand, and the United Kingdom.

French-suited Tarot
The 78-card Tarot Nouveau deck is the most widely used set for Tarot card games in France, Belgium, Denmark, and parts of Switzerland.  A full set contains the standard 52 cards plus a Knight face card for each suit ranking between the Queen and Jack. Aces are marked with "1" and are the lowest ranked cards.  There are 21 numbered trump cards and one unnumbered and suitless card, The Fool, which excuses the player from following suit.

The 54-card Cego and Industrie und Glück decks omit the aces through sixes in black suits and fives through tens in the red suits. They are found in Germany, Switzerland, and throughout the former Austro-Hungarian empire. In games played with these decks, The Fool is part of the trump suit. Plain suit cards don't have corner indexes.

German suited

German-suited cards are still common in large parts of Central Europe, although they generally compete with French-suited cards, which are often more popular.

Full German-suited
Full German-suited packs are largely confined to southern Germany and Austria where Bavarian Tarock, Tapp, Bauerntarock and Jass are played. They contain 36 cards, organized into the four German suits of Acorns, Leaves, Hearts and Bells and 9 ranks. The role of the Queen is played by another male figure, the Ober, and that of the Jack by the Unter. The Ober has its suit sign placed in a high position and the Unter in a lower position. Aces are styled as Deuces. The modern natural hierarchy is Ace > King > Ober > Unter > Ten > 9 > 8 > 7 > 6, i.e. Aces are high. In Austria and South Tyrol, the Six of Bells is often used as a wild card known as the Weli.

Italian manufacturers also started producing 40-card packs for South Tyrol since the 1980s. This set includes the 5s which allows players to play Italian card games that require 40 cards.

Standard German-suited
This is a German-suited pack without the sixes, as used for many Central European games such as Skat, Schafkopf and Sixty-Six / Mariáš. Some packs add the Six of Bells to make it into a 33-card deck.

Stripped German-suited
24-card sets are available for Schnapsen. They go from ranks nine to ace in each deck. The doubled deck version (2x24) is used for Doppelkopf. Another doubled deck version for Binokel and Gaigel replaces rank nine with sevens.

Swiss suited
Swiss-suited cards are commonly used only in part of the German-speaking area of Switzerland and Liechtenstein. Locally they are known as "German" cards.

Jass
The only frequently encountered Swiss-suited pack is known as the Jass pack. It contains 36 cards and is very similar to the southern German-suited pack. The main difference is that instead of leaves and hearts there are shields and roses, and the ten is styled as a banner.

Kaiser
The 48-card Kaiser pack is only produced to play Kaiserspiel, which requires 40 or 48 cards. If the banner and deuce are regarded as a ten and ace, the pack is equivalent to an extended Jass pack. If the banner and deuce are regarded as ace and deuce, the pack is equivalent to a full Spanish-suited pack.

Spanish suited
Spanish-suited cards are used in most Spanish-speaking countries and in the south of Italy.

Full Spanish-suited
The full Spanish-suited pack contains 48 cards, organized into the 4 Spanish suits swords, clubs, cups and coins and 12 ranks. These decks usually include two jokers. The court cards are usually numbered. The role of the queen is played by the caballo (cavalier), visually distinct from the sota (jack) by riding a horse. The common ranking from to low to high is 2, 3, 4, 5, 6, 7, 8, 9, jack (10), cavalier (11), king (12), and ace (1).

Standard Spanish-suited pack
The standard Spanish-suited pack consists of 40 cards in the ranks ace, king, cavalier, jack and 2–7.

Spanish-suited Tarot
The uncommon 64-card Tarocco Siciliano set uses Spanish styled straight swords and crude clubs like other southern Italian decks.  It omits the Two and Three of coins, and numerals one to four in clubs, swords and cups. One card, the Ace of Coins, is almost never used as it was added solely for the purpose of the stamp tax. It is one of the rare sets to feature female knaves.

Italian suited
Italian-suited cards are used only in the north of Italy.

Full Italian-suited
The full Italian-suited pack contains 52 cards, organized into the 4 Spanish suits swords, batons, cups and coins and 13 ranks. It is very similar to the full Spanish-suited pack, but does have tens as pip cards.

Standard Italian-suited
Like the standard Spanish-suited pack, the standard Italian-suited pack consists of 40 cards in the ranks ace, king, cavalier, knave and 2–7.

Italian-suited Tarot
Italian game packs are largely confined to Italy and parts of Switzerland. Among them, the 78-card Tarocco Piemontese is the most popular. Each suit now includes the Queen between the King and Knight. The hierarchy of the pip cards depends on its suit. The Fool is labelled 0 while trump 20 is usually the strongest, even beating trump 21.

A rarer 78-card set is the Swiss 1JJ Tarot found in a few pockets in Switzerland. Despite using Italian suits, the trumps labelled in French.

The 62-card Tarocco Bolognese omits pip cards 2 to 5, has Ace instead of 1, and makes the bottom four of the trumps equal in rank. It is used to play Tarocchini.

Ganjifa

The Ganjifa packs are associated with India and Persia. They are typically hand painted and many different designs are known. The suits vary in theme, and can number 4, 8, 10, 12, or more. Suits usually have 12 ranks (10 pip cards and 2 court cards), but certain decks can include more. A feature of Ganjifa cards is that they are often circular, although rectangular designs also exist.

Hanafuda

Standard Hanafuda

The Japanese Hanafuda pack contains 48 cards. There are 12 suits, each associated with a plant and a month of the Julian/Gregorian calendar, and four ranks: normal, poetry ribbon, tane, and bright. However, most suits have two normal cards and omit one of the other ranks. The exceptions are the November suit (which has one card of each suit, leaving only one normal card), and the December suit (which has three normal cards and one bright card). In Korea, where they are known as Hwatu cards, the November and December suits are swapped.

Expanded Hanafuda
Some decks include a 13th suit, which rather than being associated with a month, is labeled simply as "Snow." The Snow suit has one card of each rank (like the November suit), and is illustrated with bamboo as its plant.

Other decks include a different 13th suit labeled as "Earth," and a 14th suit labeled as "Heaven." Both of these suits have two normal cards.

Mahjong

Standard Mahjong
Mahjong sets have a different composition from playing cards, with the 144 tiles usually being divided into 3 categories:

"Suited Tiles," which constitute the majority of the pack, are divided into three suits: Circles, Bamboo, and Characters. There are nine ranks, those just being numbered 1 to 9. Each suit has four tiles of each rank, thus there are 108 suited tiles in total.

"Honor Tiles" encompasses 7 distinct tiles: East Wind, South Wind, West Wind, North Wind, Red Dragon, Green Dragon, and White Dragon. There are four of each Honor Tile, which means there are a total of 28 honor tiles.

And lastly "Flower Tiles," which is the smallest group, containing 8 tiles. The first four tiles are numbered from 1 to 4 and are associated with the Four Seasons. The last four tiles are also numbered 1 - 4, and are labeled as "The Four Gentlemen." Unlike the other groups, these tiles aren't quadruplicated, leaving only 8 tiles.

Regional differences

In Japanese packs, one of the "5 Circles" tiles is special, being highlighted completely in red. Packs often also have a red "5 Bamboo" tile and a red "5 Character" tile. Certain packs also have red versions of the 1s, 3s, 7s, and 9s, although these aren't as common. Even more rarely, some packs have a red version of the White Dragon, not to be confused with the normal Red Dragon.

Malaysian packs add 8 additional Flower Tiles, known as "The Four Arts" and "The Four Noble Professions." Vietnamese sets also have additional Flower tiles, and while they occasionally use the Arts and Noble Professions, they usually instead have 8 tiles known as "The Four Emperors" and "The Four Empresses."

Malaysian and Singaporean packs add a new category called "Animal Tiles," which have pictures of Animals on them. The number and composition of these tiles vary from region to region. Certain sets also add tiles with clown faces on them, which are labeled as animal tiles, despite illustrating humans.

Various packs also contain Jokers, that vary in number and purpose.

Chinese Domino

A Chinese Domino set is composed of every combination of outcomes possible from throwing two six-sided dice, which there are 21 of. These combinations are split across two suits: Civil and Military. Each Civil tile has a unique rank, meanwhile most Military tiles share a rank with another tile.
The eleven Civil suit tiles, from Highest to Lowest are: 6-6, 1-1, 4-4, 1-3, 5-5, 3-3, 2-2, 5-6, 4-6, 1-6, 1-5.
The ten Military suit tiles, from Highest to Lowest are: 3-6 and 4-5; 2-6 and 3-5; 2-5 and 3-4; 2-4; 1-4 and 2-3; 1-2.
The Civil suit is duplicated, bringing the size of the set to 32 dominoes.

References
 .
 
 Card Games Web Site

Card games
Playing cards
Lists of games